Manuel Dionysios Díaz Martínez (April 8, 1874 – February 20, 1929) was a Cuban fencer who competed in the 1904 Summer Olympics. He was born in Havana and died in Rochester, New York.

In 1904 he won the gold medal in the individual sabre and team foil competition. He also fenced at Harvard College.

References

External links
 profile

1874 births
1929 deaths
Sportspeople from Havana
Cuban male fencers
Fencers at the 1904 Summer Olympics
Olympic fencers of Cuba
Olympic gold medalists for Cuba
Olympic medalists in fencing
Medalists at the 1904 Summer Olympics
Harvard Crimson fencers
19th-century Cuban people
20th-century Cuban people
Cuban emigrants to the United States